Edward Lee Poh Lin (1949/50 – 20 December 2011) was a Malaysian politician of Chinese descent who was a Member of the Selangor State Assembly for N. 34 Bukit Gasing. He was also a member of the state transparency committee (SELCAT).

Elections 
In the Malaysian 2008 General Elections, he won the seat of Bukit Gasing, Selangor, on a party ticket of the DAP and received 15,735 votes with a majority of 8,812 votes.

Personal life

Death 
On 20 December 2011, Edward Lee Poh Lin died of cancer at the age of 61.

References

External links 
 YB Edward Lee Poh Lin's official website

2011 deaths
Democratic Action Party (Malaysia) politicians
1949 births